Dr. Neera Yadav is a leader of Bharatiya Janata Party Jharkhand. She was born on 18 September 1971. She is wife of Vijay Yadav. She is a member of Jharkhand Legislative Assembly from Kodarma (Vidhan Sabha constituency). She has a doctorate from Vinoba Bhave University. She completed M.Com. in 1996 and B. Ed. in 2009 from Ranchi University. She used to teach commerce at an intermediate college in Kodarma.

She has served as Minister of Human Resource Development of Jharkhand Government (2014–2019).

References

Women in Jharkhand politics
Jharkhand MLAs 2014–2019
People from Kodarma
Ranchi University alumni
Living people
Bharatiya Janata Party politicians from Jharkhand
21st-century Indian women politicians
21st-century Indian politicians
1971 births
Members of the Jharkhand Legislative Assembly